Henning Hyllested (born 28 February 1954 in Esbjerg) is a Danish politician, who was a member of the Folketing for the Red-Green Alliance political party. He was first elected into parliament at the 2011 Danish general election.

Political career
Hyllested was elected into parliament in the 2011 election, where he received 2,267 votes. He was reelected in 2015 with 3,221 votes and in 2019 with 2,349 votes.

External links 
 Biography on the website of the Danish Parliament (Folketinget)

References 

Living people
1954 births
People from Esbjerg
Red–Green Alliance (Denmark) politicians
Members of the Folketing 2011–2015
Members of the Folketing 2015–2019
Members of the Folketing 2019–2022